Alfonso Smith (born January 23, 1987) is an American football running back who is currently a free agent. He was signed by the Arizona Cardinals as an undrafted free agent in 2010. He also played college football at Kentucky.

Professional career

Arizona Cardinals
After going undrafted in the 2010 NFL Draft, Smith signed with the Arizona Cardinals as an undrafted free agent on April 24, 2010. On November 21, 2010, Smith made his NFL debut against the Kansas City Chiefs. He was cut three days later.

On January 4, 2011, Smith was signed to a future contract by the Cardinals.

San Francisco 49ers
On July 28, 2014, the San Francisco 49ers agreed to terms with Smith. He made his debut with the 49ers on December 14, 2014 against the Seattle Seahawks after Frank Gore and Carlos Hyde got injured.

References

External links
Arizona Cardinals bio
Kentucky Wildcats bio 
ESPN.com bio

1987 births
Living people
Sportspeople from San Bernardino, California
Players of American football from California
American football running backs
Kentucky Wildcats football players
Arizona Cardinals players
San Francisco 49ers players